Dilate is the third studio album by English electronic band Vessels. It was released in March 2015 under Bias Records.

Track list

References

2015 albums
Vessels (band) albums